A sinfonia is any of several musical instrumental forms. 

Sinfonia may also refer to:

 Sinfónía, a 2004 live album by Icelandic pop/rock band Todmobile with the Icelandic Symphony Orchestra
 Sinfonia (Berio), a 1968–69 composition by the Italian composer Luciano Berio
 Sinfonia (1968 Berio album), a 1968 recording of Berio conducting the premier of his "Sinfonia"
 ABC Sinfonia, the Australian Broadcasting Corporation's national training orchestra from 1967 to 1986

See also
 Sinfonia concertante
 Phi Mu Alpha Sinfonia, an American National Music Fraternity